Glenburnie railway station was a temporary terminus that served the area of Glenburnie, Fife, Scotland from 1847 to 1848 on the Edinburgh and Northern Railway and the Newburgh and North Fife Railway.

History 
The station opened on 9 December 1847 by the Edinburgh and Northern Railway. It was a short lived terminus of the Newburgh and North Fife Railway, until  opened five months later, with a siding that served a loading bank to the west and a signal box also to the west. The station closed on 17 May 1848.

References 

Disused railway stations in Fife
Railway stations in Great Britain opened in 1847
Railway stations in Great Britain closed in 1848
1847 establishments in Scotland
1848 disestablishments in Scotland